Aberargie is a village in the south eastern region of Perth and Kinross. It lies on the western edge of the old Abernethy Parish on the banks of the River Farg, from which it derives its name.

Origin and History 

Aberargie is recorded in the Pictish Chronicle as part of Nechtan's land grant in 460AD, and may have been in existence for much longer. Aberargies' place in most history books is as a small part of the bigger Parish of Abernethy, but there was at one time a thriving community, based on the utilisation of the River Farg to power water mills for various purposes from sawing timber to the milling of flax and meal. Mills have been recorded at Pottie, part of which still stands at the bottom of the Farg Glen, Ayton Farm, Mill House, Willow Bank, which also has some standing ruins, and Gowlie. The feu duty for most of these mills up until the late 19th century was payable to Balmerino Abbey Estates. The mills had all ceased production by the early 20th century, and the most complete, at Mill House, was demolished in the 1950s.

Archaeological surface finds from fields in the vicinity of the village range from neolithic flints, to the full range of Scottish Medieval Pottery  and flintlock rifle/pistol flints. Further indicating an extensive period of settlement and activity in the area.

Aberargie Today

References

Villages in Perth and Kinross